Jim Romaniszyn (born September 17, 1951) is a former American football linebacker. He played for the Cleveland Browns from 1973 to 1974 and for the New England Patriots in 1976.

References

1951 births
Living people
American football linebackers
Edinboro Fighting Scots football players
Cleveland Browns players
New England Patriots players